William Louis Taggart Webb (6 February 1898 – 3 April 1969) was an English first-class cricketer and civil servant.

Webb was born at Camberwell. He first joined the Civil Service in August 1922 as a clerk in the Inland Revenue. He represented the Civil Service cricket team in its only appearance in first-class cricket against the touring New Zealanders at Chiswick in 1927. Batting twice during the match, he scored 59 runs in the Civil Service first-innings before being dismissed by Matt Henderson, while in their second-innings he was dismissed for 17 runs by Roger Blunt. 

He later transferred to the Ministry of Labour in November 1929. He died at Southport in April 1969.

References

External links

1898 births
1969 deaths
People from Camberwell
English civil servants
English cricketers
Civil Service cricketers